The 1920–21 season is the 47th season of competitive football by Rangers.

Overview
Rangers played a total of 48 competitive matches during the 1920–21 season. The side won the league winning thirty-five of the 42 league games and recording only one league defeat, at home to Celtic.

The side also reached the final of the Scottish Cup that season, beating the likes of Alloa Athletic and Dumbarton en route to a 1-0 defeat at the hands of Partick Thistle.

Results
All results are written with Rangers' score first.

Scottish League Division One

Scottish Cup

Appearances

See also
 1920–21 in Scottish football
 1920–21 Scottish Cup

Rangers F.C. seasons
Rangers
Scottish football championship-winning seasons